Greece competed with 14 athletes at the 1904 Summer Olympics in St. Louis, United States. Greek athletes have competed in every Summer Olympic Games.

Medalists

Results by event

Athletics

Tug of war

Weightlifting

References

Official Olympic Reports
International Olympic Committee results database

Nations at the 1904 Summer Olympics
1904
Olympics